Henri-Paul Pellaprat (Saint-Maur-des-Fossés, 1869–1954) was a French chef, founder with the journalist Marthe Distel of Le Cordon Bleu cooking school in Paris. He was the author of La cuisine familiale et pratique and other classic French cookery texts. He worked from the age of twelve as a pastry boy and then cooked at many of the most famous restaurants of the La Belle Époque Paris such as the Maison Dorée. He taught at l’École du Cordon bleu for 32 years; his students including Maurice Edmond Sailland, later known as Curnonsky, and Raymond Oliver. 

In 1966, after his death, his book L'Art  Culinaire Moderne was translated into English and published for the American market under the name Modern French Culinary Art. It contained 2030 recipes and many color photos, covering everything from everyday casual French cooking to haute cuisine. Discussing this translation, the New York Times  wrote, "one could not hardly ask for a better or more sumptupus one", adding that this book "demonstrates one again that cooking can be among the higher arts."

Bibliography

Most of these books went through multiple editions, and share recipes. Date is of the first edition of each title.

 1914, La Cuisine de tous les jours, 240 p.
 1927, La Pâtisserie pratique, 238 p.
 1936, L'Art culinaire moderne, 711 p., preface by Curnonsky
 1937, La Cuisine froide, 166 p.
 1937, Les Desserts, 195 p.
 1937, Les Menus détaillés de la ménagère, 230 p.
 1937, Manuel de la cuisine végétarienne et de régimes, 176 p.
 1941, 390 recettes de cuisine pour les restrictions alimentaires, 176 p.
 1942, Le Cuisinier, 45 p.
 1945, 300 recettes de cuisine à la Cornue, 340 p.
 1946, Cuisinons vite et bien, 140 recettes destinées à la femme qui travaille, 70 p.
 1951, Les Oeufs, les légumes, les farinages, quelques régimes, 181 p.
 1954, Le Poisson dans la cuisine française, 231 p.
 1955, La Cuisine familiale, 215 p.
 1957, Le Nouveau guide culinaire, 368 p.
 1959, Traité de la cuisine familiale, 297 p.
 1966, La Cuisine en 20 leçons, 320 p.

References

External links
 Henri-Paul Pellaprat (1869-1952), un véritable cordon bleu 

French chefs
1869 births
1954 deaths
French company founders
Founders of educational institutions
French cuisine